Allan James Clayton  (1981) is a British tenor singer.

Clayton was a chorister at Worcester Cathedral and a choral scholar in the Choir of St John's College, Cambridge. He was a BBC New Generation Artist from 2007-09 and winner of the Royal Philharmonic Society Singer Award in 2018.

Clayton was appointed Member of the Order of the British Empire (MBE) in the 2021 Birthday Honours for services to opera.

In 2022 he starred in a Royal Opera House production of Peter Grimes which was hailed as one of the finest opera productions in the UK for decades. The Guardian said "Clayton makes a heartbreaking, supremely lyrical Grimes, singing with remarkable sensitivity and great refinement of tone" and the FT described him as "vocally outstanding in the role, powerful, sensitive and dealing with its idiosyncratic vocal challenges as if they are no problem at all"

References

Year of birth missing (living people)
Living people
English operatic tenors
Alumni of St John's College, Cambridge
21st-century British opera singers
21st-century British male singers
21st-century English singers
Members of the Order of the British Empire
1981 births